Os Mutantes (meaning  the mutants) are an influential Brazilian rock band that were linked with the Tropicália movement, a dissident musical movement during the Brazilian dictatorship of the late 1960s. The band is considered to be one of the main groups of Brazilian rock. Heavily influenced by Anglo-American psychedelic pop, they bridged Brazilian sensibilities together with studio trickery, feedback, distortion, and musique concrète. They released their now-acclaimed self-titled debut album in 1968. 

Os Mutantes debuted their work in 1966, as a trio, when they presented themselves in the program O Pequeno Mundo de Ronnie Von of TV Record. The group was christened Mutantes by Ronnie Von himself, right before their first TV appearance. The group until then used call themselves Os Bruxos (meaning The Witches, in Portuguese) and the suggestion came from the book Emperor of the Mutants, by Stefan Wul (the book's original title in french is La Mort Vivante). The group quickly became one of the main figures of the "new MPB" (popular brazilian music), influenced by Tropicália, until their breakup in 1978, only with Sérgio Dias as an original member. Throughout these twelve years, nine albums were recorded, although two of them - O A e o Z and Tecnicolor - were only released in the 1990s. It was during this decade that the importance of Os Mutantes was recognized, by both national and international rock, as one of the most creative dynamic, radical and talented groups of the psychedelic era.

Although the original line-up (Rita Lee, Arnaldo Baptista and Sérgio Dias; and later with Liminha and Dinho Leme) made the most notable breakthrough for the group, it has gone through numerous personnel changes throughout its existence. After a hiatus from the late 1970s to the early 2000s, the band reunited in 2006, touring and recording new material.

History

Origins
Os Mutantes was formed in São Paulo in 1966 by two brothers: Arnaldo Baptista (bass, keyboards and vocals) and Sérgio Dias Baptista (guitar and vocals), and lead singer Rita Lee. They were originally named Six Sided Rockers. The Baptistas' father was a poet and mother a pianist, and the two had previously had an all-male band called The Wooden Faces, while Lee was in an all-female band called The Teenage Singers. Sérgio Dias' guitar, the Golden Guitar (Guitarra de Ouro), was created by Arnaldo and Sérgio's brother, Cláudio César Dias Baptista, who built many of their instruments and electronic effects. Their current name was settled upon immediately before a performance on a Brazilian television program.

Tropicália

Through other TV performances, the band was able to meet Gilberto Gil, an influential musician in the Tropicália movement, who brought them into the movement's circle. Os Mutantes released two albums heavily influenced by Tropicália, which blended psychedelic rock with other forms of art. They performed and recorded with many artists of this period, including Caetano Veloso and Gilberto Gil, before Veloso and Gil were arrested and subsequently exiled by the military government of Brazil in early 1969. During this period, Os Mutantes was also threatened by the military government of Brazil of that time.

In 1967 Os Mutantes backed Gilberto Gil when he competed in the third annual Festival of Brazilian Popular Music, making Brazilian music history by being one of the first two rock groups to participate, and Gil won second prize in the song competition with his song "Domingo no Parque" ("Sunday in the Park"). Gil's friend Caetano Veloso also performed with a rock group, São Paulo band Beat Boys, and although his unorthodox performance met with some initial resistance, he eventually won over the crowd with his song "Alegria, Alegria", which was awarded fourth place in the competition. The next year Os Mutantes collaborated with Gilberto Gil on his second solo album, and they also contributed to the manifesto work of the Tropicália movement, the landmark 1968 album Tropicália: ou Panis et Circencis (Tropicália: or Bread and Circuses) a collaborative album recorded by all the major figures in the movement, including Os Mutantes, Gilberto Gll, Caetano Veloso, Gal Costa, and Tom Zé, with orchestrations by Rogerio Duprat and lyrical contributions from Torquato Neto.

In sharp contrast to their well-received festival appearance in 1967, the group famously met with intense hostility when they backed Caetano Veloso for his two now-legendary performances at the third International Song Festival in Rio, which caused a near-riot. In the first round of the festival's song competition on 12 September 1968, Veloso and Os Mutantes were loudly jeered, booed and insulted by a large group of students in the audience, who were vehemently opposed to the Tropicalists' musical experiments, and who were further infuriated by Veloso's outlandish costume, and his provocatively sexual stage movements. In the second round of the competition on 15 September, Veloso and Os Mutantes performed a wild new psychedelic piece that Veloso had written for the occasion, called "É proibido proibir" ("It Is Forbidden to Forbid"); this was recorded live and an excerpt was later released as the b-side of the studio recording of the single. The students began heckling even before the ensemble took the stage, and throughout the song, the anti-Tropicalist faction in the audience jeered and booed so loudly that the performers could barely be heard. The students also began throwing eggs, fruit, vegetables and paper balls and a section of the audience stood up and turned their backs on the performers, to which Os Mutantes responded by turning their backs to the audience. Os Mutantes continued playing, but Veloso stopped singing and spontaneously launched into an impassioned diatribe, denouncing the student faction for their conservatism, which provoked even louder howls of disapproval from the audience. Although the ensemble was joined on stage by Gilberto Gil, who came out to show his support, the jeering continued unabated, so Veloso angrily declared that he would no longer participate in the competition; he then finished the song deliberately out of tune, and he, Gilberto and Os Mutantes left the stage arm-in-arm.

Mid-seventies
In 1971, bassist Arnolpho Lima Filho ("Liminha") and drummer Ronaldo Leme ("Dinho") officially joined the band. They released five albums together before Lee departed in 1972 to start a solo career. Rita Lee's 1972 album Hoje É o Primeiro Dia do Resto da Sua Vida was actually recorded with Os Mutantes but credited to Rita Lee due to record company disagreements.  Subsequently, the band moved in a progressive rock direction with the album O A e o Z, recorded in 1973 but released only in 1992 due to disagreement with the record company. Arnaldo left the band in that year to pursue a solo career due to differences with other band members and problems with the abuse of LSD, followed by Dinho and, a year later, Liminha. Arnaldo subsequently was institutionalized and jumped from the building's window, causing a six-week coma. Sérgio Dias, the only remaining original member, led the band until its dissolution in 1978. During this time, they released one more studio album, a live album and an EP. Two unreleased albums were released many years later, the aforementioned O A e o Z and Tecnicolor recorded in 1970 and released in 2000.

Reunion
Os Mutantes (Arnaldo, Sérgio and Dinho, sans Rita Lee and Liminha—Lee was replaced with Zélia Duncan on vocals) played live for the first time since 1978 at the Tropicalia exhibition at London's Barbican Arts Centre on May 22, 2006. This performance, which was first by drummer Dinho Leme since the end of Os Mutantes, was followed by shows in New York City, Los Angeles (with the Flaming Lips), San Francisco, Seattle, Denver, Chicago, and Miami.

They have also collaborated with British DJ JD Twitch, in a Britain/Brazil culture project in 2007, called Trocabrahma. In September 2007, both Arnaldo Baptista and Zélia Duncan left the band. Both expressed wishes to continue with their respective solo projects. Sérgio Dias, however, vowed to keep the reformed band alive, not wanting to let "the giant sleep again", as he put it.

In November, it was reported that Liminha would return to the fold, while Karina Zeviani was said to replace Duncan as the band's female vocalist. Neither is part of the new band lineup. Sérgio Dias announced in late 2007 the recording of a new studio album, with some collaboration by Tom Zé and Devendra Banhart. In April 2008, Os Mutantes released their first song in more than 30 years, called "Mutantes Depois", with new female vocalist Bia Mendes and male vocalist Fabio Recco, available for digital download and online stream.

In June 2008, "A Minha Menina" was the featured audio track for the McDonald's commercial "Victory."

In 2009, the band announced their first new release in 35 years, Haih Or Amortecedor, which was released on September 8, by ANTI- Records.  They did an extensive North American tour in support of the album in the fall of 2009 and played at the Glastonbury Festival in June 2010. The band also toured North America in the fall of 2010.

In 2011, they collaborated with Of Montreal on the song "Bat Macumba" for the Red Hot Organization's most recent charitable album "Red Hot+Rio 2." The album is a follow-up to the 1996 "Red Hot + Rio." Proceeds from the sales will be donated to raise awareness and money to fight AIDS/HIV and related health and social issues.

On April 30, 2013, Fool Metal Jack was released. Unlike Haih Or Amortecedor, the album's lyrics are mostly in English. The album features a slightly different lineup than Haih, with Ani Cordero replacing Dinho Leme on drums and Amy Crawford replacing Henrique Peters on keyboards. The band toured North America in support of the album.

In 2022-2023, Os Mutantes fronted by Sérgio Dias, went on a North American tour.

Legacy
When Os Mutantes was formed, it combined influences from rock acts from the English-speaking world like The Beatles, Jimi Hendrix, Sly & the Family Stone, the Ventures, and Duane Eddy with bossa nova, tropicália, samba and the cultural legacy of the Brazilian art vanguards from the modernist movement.

Os Mutantes is one of the most well-known and influential rock bands in Brazil. In addition, many contemporary underground or independent bands in the United States and Europe cite Os Mutantes as a major influence. Kurt Cobain publicly requested a reunion tour from the trio in 1993, writing a letter to Arnaldo Baptista. Cobain was introduced to them by Pat Fear from White Flag (whose collaboration with Redd Kross and other friends under the name The Tater Totz was the first American band to cover or even cite Os Mutantes on their 1988 LP Alien Sleestaks from Brazil). Beck paid tribute to the group with his single "Tropicália" from the album Mutations. The Bees covered "A Minha Menina" on their first album, Sunshine Hit Me. Red Hot Chili Peppers bass player Flea has stated on his Twitter account that "Os Mutantes the Brazilian band is so great". Kevin Barnes  Of Montreal cites Os Mutantes as an important influence. Talking Heads frontman David Byrne has worked to publish and promote the group's music through his Luaka Bop label.

Their song Ave Lucifer has been sampled on Captain Murphy's song "The Killing Joke" (produced by Flying Lotus).

Discography
The discography of Os Mutantes consists of ten studio albums, two live albums, ten compilation albums, four extended plays, ten singles and one video album

Albums

Studio albums

Live albums

Compilation albums

EPs

Box sets

Singles

Videos

Other recordings featuring Os Mutantes

Band members

Timeline

References

External links
 
 Arnaldo Baptista official site
 Sérgio Dias official site
 Rita Lee official site
 Os Mutantes: Album Guide
 Cláudio César Dias Baptista - CCDB official site

Brazilian progressive rock groups
Brazilian rock music groups
Música popular brasileira musical groups
Brazilian psychedelic rock music groups
Tropicália
Luaka Bop artists
Musical groups from São Paulo
Musical groups established in 1966
Musical groups disestablished in 1978
1966 establishments in Brazil
1978 disestablishments in Brazil
Musical groups reestablished in 2006
2006 establishments in Brazil
20th-century Brazilian musicians
21st-century Brazilian musicians
Anti- (record label) artists
Polydor Records artists
Philips Records artists
Som Livre artists